Lathi is one of the 182 Legislative Assembly constituencies of Gujarat state in India. It is part of Amreli district.

List of segments

This assembly seat represents the following segments,

 Lathi Taluka
 Babra Taluka
 Lilia Taluka (Part) Villages – Kankot Nana, Rajkot Nana

Members of Legislative Assembly
2007 - Hanubhai Dhorajiya, Bharatiya Janata Party
2012 - Bavkubhai Undhad, Indian National Congress
2014 - Bavkubhai Undhad, Bharatiya Janata Party

Election results

2022

2017

2014

2012

See also
 List of constituencies of Gujarat Legislative Assembly
 Gujarat Legislative Assembly

References

External links
 

Assembly constituencies of Gujarat
Amreli district